William Weston Mitchell (born November 12, 1966) is a Democratic member of the Georgia House of Representatives, serving since 2003. Mitchell previously served on the Stone Mountain City Council from 1995 to 2002.

References

External links
 
Legislative page

Living people
Democratic Party members of the Georgia House of Representatives
People from Stone Mountain, Georgia
Politicians from Savannah, Georgia
21st-century American politicians
Rutgers University alumni
University of Southern California alumni
Atlanta Law School alumni
Georgia (U.S. state) city council members
1956 births